Franz Weselik (20 April 1903 – 15 March 1962) was a former Austrian football player.

International career
He made his debut for Austria in May 1928 against Hungary and earned 11 caps, scoring 13 goals. His final international was an April 1933 match, also against Hungary.

Honours
Austrian Football Bundesliga (2):
 1929, 1930
Austrian Cup (1):
 1927   
Mitropa Cup (1):
 1930

References

External links
Rapid stats - Rapid Archive

1903 births
1962 deaths
Austrian footballers
Austria international footballers
SK Rapid Wien players
FC Mulhouse players
Jönköpings Södra IF players
Austrian Football Bundesliga players
Ligue 1 players
Austrian expatriate footballers
Expatriate footballers in France
Austrian football managers
FC Mulhouse managers
Association football forwards
Burials at Ottakring Cemetery